The Sydney Metro is a fully automated rapid transit system serving the city of Sydney, New South Wales, Australia. Work is progressing to extend this line from Chatswood to Bankstown, running under Sydney Harbour and the Sydney Central Business District (CBD) with a scheduled 2024 completion. When completed, this line will have  of twin tracks and 31 stations.

Two additional lines have been announced: Sydney Metro Western Sydney Airport and Sydney Metro West. It will comprise six stations and service the new Western Sydney International (Nancy-Bird Walton) Airport upon opening in 2026.

It is planned to comprise nine stations, serviced by underground twin tracks. The line will also service Parramatta and Sydney Olympic Park upon opening in 2030.

Sydney Metro is Australia's first fully automated (driverless) rapid transit system. There have been plans for an underground metro system for the city as early as 2001, with unsuccessful attempts to build a line between 2008 and 2010. Despite extensive plans, disputes over privatisation and funding had hampered government approval, delaying its inception. Government approval for what was initially known as the North West Rail Link, Sydney's first underground metro, was given in 2013. Later, the route was extended and the name changed to Sydney Metro.

The network is controlled by the Sydney Metro agency, under the umbrella of Transport for NSW. Services are operated by Metro Trains Sydney and integrated with the established Sydney Trains network.

History

Earlier proposals

The first proposals for a metro system in Sydney were put forward in 2001, when Co-ordinator-General of Rail Ron Christie released his "Long-term Strategic Plan for Rail" report, outlining long-term goals for the expansion of the rail network. He suggested that some "metro" lines—operationally independent from the existing network—should be constructed past 2020 due to capacity constraints. This was later dismissed by the New South Wales Government as only a "shopping list" of potential projects.

The idea for a metro resurfaced in late 2007 when discussions about an underground 'Anzac Line' took place within the NSW Government. The line would have run from West Ryde in Sydney's northwest to Malabar in the southeast but did not come to fruition. In early 2008, following the shelving of various heavy rail expansion projects from the 2005 Metropolitan Rail Expansion Program (MREP), the Government officially announced the  North West Metro. Expected to cost $12 billion, it would have linked Rouse Hill in Sydney's northwest with the CBD, with construction starting in 2010 and finishing in 2017.

The construction of the North West Metro was however dependent on the privatisation of the electricity network, and after a change of the state's Premier in late 2008, it was cancelled due to budgetary concerns. Construction was scheduled to start in 2010, like its predecessor, but finished earlier in 2015. The CBD Metro was to have formed the "central spine" of a future metro network, with a planned West Metro extension to Westmead and Parramatta to be constructed soon after, subject to Federal funding. Reception to the plans was mixed, with Opposition leader Barry O'Farrell accusing the Premier of "making it up as he goes along" after costings weren't released until after the press conference, and criticism came from the Greens because the route seemed designed to pass through marginal electoral seats. The Government's initial submission to Infrastructure Australia for funding was rejected due to "a lack of integrated planning". It was later revealed that the cost had jumped from $4 billion to $5.3 billion in six months, and internal estimates showed that the metro would run at only 15% of its maximum capacity.

The CBD Metro was cancelled in early 2010 after the Premier was deposed a few months before in 2009. The Government had spent almost $410 million on the project. The new Premier Kristina Keneally chose instead to focus on the expansion of the existing heavy rail network, including the North West Rail Link and South West Rail Link.

Revival

In mid-2012, the newly elected Coalition government announced Sydney's Rail Future and the NSW Transport Masterplan. Under this proposal, the North West Rail Link would be built as a single-deck, privately operated metro connecting to a future second harbour crossing. These plans received criticism on the basis that they might not have the capacity of existing double-deck trains  and concerns over the inability of trains on the existing network to use the new crossing.

In 2014, the Government announced the second harbour crossing under the name Sydney Rapid Transit, as part of the 'Rebuilding NSW' infrastructure plan funded through the sale of electricity infrastructure. The new railway would cross Sydney Harbour, tunnel beneath the CBD, and join the Bankstown line which would be converted to metro standards.

The system was officially renamed 'Sydney Metro' in June 2015 following the passage of power privatisation bills. Opposing parties warned the government that the sale of the power infrastructure may not provide the capital needed.

In July 2018, Sydney Metro was established as a statutory authority, tasked with leading the delivery of the metro system. , Peter Regan is the Chief Executive of the agency.

In January 2023, it was announced that the emergency exits in tunnels on the Metro West and Metro Western Sydney Airport lines will be spaced at  where possible, matching the existing lines.

In February 2023, as part of the 2023 state election campaign, the government of Dominic Perrottet announced business cases would be produced for a further 100km of extensions for the Sydney Metro network. This included the following links:

 Tallawong to St Marys
 Westmead to the Aerotropolis
 Bankstown to Glenfield via Liverpool
 Macarthur to the Aerotropolis

Operations 
Sydney Metro services are operated by Metro Trains Sydney, a joint venture between MTR Corporation, John Holland Group, and UGL Rail, who will operate and maintain the network under a 15-year contract. The network is fully automated to the GoA4 level and uses CBTC signalling throughout.

Network

The Metro North West Line is currently the only line in the Sydney Metro network, linking Tallawong to Chatswood with 13 stations along a  distance. Since July 2019, services take 37 minutes from end to end, at a frequency of every 4 minutes during peak hours and every 10 minutes at all other times. Before that, for the first few weeks after opening, the line operated once every 5 minutes during the peak hours until it was increased to every 4 minutes.

Services began on 26 May 2019. For the first 6 months of operation, they were supplemented with trackwork-style rail replacement buses for late-night services from Sundays to Wednesdays.

Capacity

Stage 1 (Metro North West) operates with 6-car trains running on 4-minute headways. After the addition of the Stage 2 extension to Bankstown, the stations’ platforms will be configured to allow for future use of 8-car trains and the signalling system designed to allow for 2-minute headways, both of which are planned to be introduced once sufficient patronage demands it. Eight-car trains have a design capacity of 1,539 customers and increasing the running frequency to ultimately 30 trains per hour (2-minute headway) would provide a maximum capacity of 46,170 passengers per hour per direction.

Rolling stock

The network operates using 22 6-car Metropolis Stock trains, which are fully automated electric multiple units. Each single-deck train features two dedicated areas for prams, luggage and bicycles. There are three doorways per side per carriage and no internal doors between the carriages. In a 6-car configuration, the trains have a seating capacity of 378 people, with a total capacity of 1,100. Seating arrangements on the Alstom trains are longitudinal, following the style of most other metro trains. The trains utilise Alstom's trademark Urbalis 400 Grade-of-Automation signalling system that ensures that trains are capable of operating automatically at all times including door closing, obstacle detection and emergencies.

Before the introduction of services, a full-scale model of the new train was built for use on public display, including at the annual Sydney Royal Easter Show. The trains were built at Alstom's rolling stock manufacturing facility in India, with the first six-car Sydney Metro train arriving in Rouse Hill on 26 September 2017 to undergo testing.

In February 2018, dynamic testing on the first of the trainsets began. Testing was done on brakes, passenger information displays, lighting and door operation.

Patronage

The following table lists patronage figures for the network during the corresponding financial year. Major events that affected the number of journeys made or how patronage is measured are included as notes.

Ticketing and costs

Sydney Metro uses the Opal card ticketing system. The fare system is fully integrated with the Sydney Trains network and the NSW TrainLink Intercity network - trips involving suburban, metro and intercity services are calculated as a single fare and there is no interchange penalty. Students who use the Sydney Metro network to get to and from schools can apply for a free School Opal card. Opal is also valid on bus, ferry, and light rail services but separate fares apply for these modes. The following table lists Opal fares for reusable smartcards and single trip tickets:

^ = $2.50 for Senior/Pensioner cardholders

As there are no return or periodical options available, reusable Opal cards include several caps to reduce the cost for frequent travellers:

Projects

Sydney Metro Northwest

The first stage connects Sydney's north-western suburbs to Chatswood. At Epping, the line connects to the existing  Epping to Chatswood rail link, which was converted from heavy rail to rapid transit standards and segregated from the existing Sydney Trains network. Passengers can interchange with the existing system at both Epping and Chatswood. Construction on Sydney Metro Northwest began in late 2013. The line opened on 26 May 2019.

In November 2016, Sydney Metro, in particular, the John Holland Group, Dragados and Transport for NSW, were awarded the 2016 NSW Premier's Award for Building Infrastructure for the  twintunnels in Bella Vista and Epping, which are currently the longest tunnels constructed in Australia. The completion of these tunnels in early 2016 marked the completion of the first stage of Sydney Metro Northwest. The NSW Premier's award recognises "infrastructure projects in the state that make a difference to the local community".

Sydney Metro City & Southwest

The centrepiece of the project is a new twin-tunnel rail crossing under Sydney Harbour. From Central, the new track will be built to Sydenham railway station. From Sydenham, the existing Bankstown railway line as far as Bankstown railway station will be converted from heavy rail to rapid transit standard. Construction on Sydney Metro City & Southwest began in mid-2017. The line is planned to open in 2024.

Together with planned improvements to the Main Western line, the project is expected to increase capacity on the Sydney rail network by up to 60%, and allow for the movement of over 100,000 extra commuters across the network every hour. The City & Southwest extension represents the first phase of the "southern sector conversion" envisaged in Sydney's Rail Future.

Sydney Metro West

Sydney Metro West is a separate line between the Sydney CBD and Westmead. The line was announced as an official project on 14 November 2016, with up to 12 stations being considered including station locations at Parramatta, Sydney Olympic Park, Five Dock, the Bays Precinct and the CBD. In March 2018, the government announced that an additional station would be built at Westmead, as well as one that connected to either of the existing stations at Concord West or North Strathfield.

The 2019-2020 New South Wales state budget in June 2019 allocated funding of $6.4 billion over four years to the project, with construction to be fast-tracked to start in 2020.

The government announced and confirmed seven station locations along the line in 2019, with a further 2 stations announced in 2021. Initial work is expected to start in 2020, with tunnelling to begin in 2022. The line is expected to open to the public by 2030.

Sydney Metro Western Sydney Airport 

In March 2018, the federal and state governments signed the Western Sydney City Deal and announced the development of stage 1 of the North-South Link as part of the deal. Stage 1 of the Western Sydney Airport line will operate between St Marys and Badgerys Creek Aerotropolis via Western Sydney Airport. The line is expected to start construction in late 2020 and to be completed in 2026 in time for the opening of the airport.

In the 2019-2020 federal budget in April 2019, the federal government announced a contribution of $3.5 billion to deliver stage 1 of the rail link. This funding also includes $50 million towards the business case process for the North-South Rail Link and $61 million for the Elizabeth Drive overpass. In the 2019–2020 New South Wales state budget in June 2019, the state government announced an investment of $2.0 billion to commence the construction of stage 1 for the next 4 years.

This line will have a much higher voltage than that of the North West, City & Southwest lines, this time a single-phase alternating current at 50 Hz.

Potential extensions

Western Sydney
The Northwest line is proposed to be extended to St Marys to the west via Schofields, connecting to the Western Sydney Airport line and North Shore & Western lines. However, previous plans have shown connections between the Northwest line and  Western Sydney Airport line potentially occurring at either Schofields (extending both lines), or Tallawong (through extension of the Western Sydney Airport line). It will not be possible for the two lines to be connected as a single line due to incompatible train lengths and power systems (1500V DC vs 25kV AC). 

The Western Sydney Airport line is planned to be extended to the Airport & South Line at Macarthur and Glenfield to the south. 

The West line would also be extended from Westmead to the Aerotropolis or Western Sydney Airport.

South Western Sydney
The City & Southwest line is being planned to be extended from Bankstown to Glenfield via Liverpool, with a further potential extension to the Aerotropolis via the existing South West Rail link that serves Leppington. 
The second phase of the southern sector conversion would see two of the four tracks between Sydenham and Hurstville, part of the Sydney Trains Illawarra line, converted to rapid transit and added to the Sydney Metro network. This would increase rail capacity between Hurstville and the city by 10 trains per hour. Though a precise construction timeframe was not provided, the plan envisages all work being completed by 2031. Developing plans for this extension has proven difficult, and the Sydney Morning Herald reported in February 2016 that the project may have been dropped.

South Eastern Sydney
The South East Sydney Transport Strategy of the New South Wales government envisions a metro line starting from the CBD with stations at Green Square, Randwick, two at Maroubra, Malabar and La Perouse built by 2041, as well as another one from Randwick to Eastlakes and, via the Domestic and International terminals of Sydney Airport, further on to Brighton-Le-Sands and then Kogarah by 2056.

In media
A Seven News documentary on the early construction of part of the Sydney Metro aired on the Seven Network on 14 July 2016 titled World's Best Metro.

A multi-part SBS documentary on the tunnelling for the metro titled Sydney's Super Tunnel aired in 2020.

See also 

 List of metro systems
 Light rail in Sydney
 Sydney Trains
 Metro Tunnel

References

External links

 NSW Government Sydney Metro Website
Transport NSW Metro Page

 
Rapid transit in Australia
Metro
Railway lines opened in 2019
2019 establishments in Australia